{{DISPLAYTITLE:C5H6O5}}
The molecular formula C5H6O5 may refer to:

 Dioxalin
 Ketoglutaric acid (disambiguation)
 alpha-Ketoglutaric acid
 Acetonedicarboxylic acid (beta-Ketoglutaric acid)